

The ACBA Midour, Midour 2 and Midour 3 are a series of glider tugs manufactured by the Aéro Club du Bas Armagnac in France, and named after the Midou River.

Design and development
The Midour is a double-seat, low-wing monoplane of conventional configuration, fitted with a fixed, tricycle undercarriage. Developed in the workshop of the ACBA using the wings of a Robin DR400, the Midour first flew in the early 1970s and four additional examples to the original design have been built, along with two modified versions.

Although the Midour is sometimes equipped with only a single seat, a passenger can be carried behind the pilot, to assist in the release of gliders being towed.

Variants

ACBA-7 Midour
Original version with  Lycoming O-360 engine; five built.

ACBA-8 Midour 2
Improved version with entirely new wing design. One built.

ACBA Midour 3
Optimised, quieted version of Midour 2 with new fuselage and canopy, designed to be especially quiet due to noise pollution concerns. One built.

Specifications (ACBA-7)

See also

References

External links

 ACBA Midour - CSVVA – Airliners.net

Midour
1990s French special-purpose aircraft
Glider tugs
Single-engined tractor aircraft
Low-wing aircraft